Gennifer Diane Brandon (born November 23, 1990) is an American professional basketball player who last played for the Chicago Sky of the Women's National Basketball Association (WNBA). She played college basketball at the University of California, Berkeley and attended Chatsworth High School in Chatsworth, California.

California statistics

Source

Professional career
Brandon was drafted by the Chicago Sky of the WNBA in the second round of the 2014 WNBA Draft.

References

External links
California Golden Bears bio

1990 births
Living people
African-American basketball players
American women's basketball players
Forwards (basketball)
Basketball players from California
California Golden Bears women's basketball players
Chicago Sky draft picks
Chicago Sky players
McDonald's High School All-Americans
People from Lynwood, California
21st-century African-American sportspeople
21st-century African-American women